PNPase can refer to:

Polynucleotide phosphorylase, an RNA degrading protein
Purine nucleoside phosphorylase, an enzyme involved in purine metabolism